Peter Geronazzo is a Canadian-Italian retired ice hockey center who was an All-American for Colorado College

Career
Geronazzo began playing for Colorado College in the fall of 1992 as a walk-on. He had a rather pedestrian first season as a sophomore during which the Tigers finished dead-last in the WCHA. After a coaching change in the off-season, both the team and Geronazzo greatly improved; CC won the regular season title for the first time in 37 years with Geronazzo more than doubling his point production. As a senior, Geronazzo took a more prominent role in the Tigers' offense, tying for team lead in scoring and winning a second-consecutive WCHA title. Geronazzo continued to improve in his final season, leading the team in goals and points while finishing in the top ten for the nation. Geronazzo helped Colorado College march all the way to the NCAA championship game. He recorded a goal and an assist in the title match but it wasn't enough as CC fell 2–3 in overtime.

After college, Geronazzo travelled to Italy and played for HC 24 Milan. He averaged over a point per game in the playoffs as his team reached the league final. The following season he returned to North America. Outside of a brief stint with the Orlando Solar Bears, he spent the next 5 years with the Pee Dee Pride. He produced solid offensive numbers, helping the team win a regular season title in 1999. Geronazzo professional career came to an unsavory end during the 2002 ECHL playoffs when he was suspended indefinitely following an investigation that revealed he had verbally threatened an official.

In 2014, Geronazzo was inducted into both the Trail Sports Hall of Fame and the Colorado Springs Sports Hall of Fame.

Statistics

Regular season and playoffs

Awards and honors

References

External links

1971 births
Living people
Ice hockey people from British Columbia
People from Trail, British Columbia
Canadian ice hockey centres
Italian ice hockey centres
Colorado College Tigers men's ice hockey players
AHCA Division I men's ice hockey All-Americans
Orlando Solar Bears (IHL) players
Pee Dee Pride players